Alameda is a station on the Green and Red Lines of the Lisbon Metro. The station is located on Avenida Almirante Reis at Alameda Dom Afonso Henriques, east of the Instituto Superior Técnico.

History
This section of the Green Line opened in June 1972 together with Arroios, Areeiro, Roma and Alvalade stations. The original architectural design of the station was by Dinis Gomes with installation art by the plastic artist Maria Keil. Full refurbishment of the station was completed in March 1998, which involved extending the piers of the existing station for the construction of the Red Line. The architect for this project was Manuel Tainha and the artist was Luís Noronha da Costa.

The Red Line station opened in May 1998 in conjunction with Olaias, Bela Vista, Chelas and Oriente stations, with a view to extending the network to the area of Expo '98. The architectural design for this is also by Manuel Tainha and the art work by plastic artists Costa Pinheiro and Juhana Blomstedt, and sculptor Alberto Carneiro.

Fire and a large explosion on the morning of October 19, 1997, during the refurbishment of the station, killed two workers.

Connections

Urban buses

Carris 
 206 Cais do Sodré ⇄ Senhor Roubado (Metro) (morning service)
 706 Cais do Sodré ⇄ Estação Santa Apolónia
 708 Martim Moniz ⇄ Parque das Nações Norte
 713 Alameda D. A. Henriques ⇄ Estação Campolide
 716 Alameda D. A. Henriques ⇄ Benfica - Al. Padre Álvaro Proença
 717 Praça do Chile ⇄ Fetais
 718 ISEL ⇄ Al. Afonso Henriques
 720 Picheleira / Rua Faria Vasconcelos ⇄ Calvário
 735 Cais do Sodré ⇄ Hospital Santa Maria

Aerobus 
 Linha 1 Aeroporto ⇄ Cais do Sodré

See also
 List of Lisbon metro stations

References

External links

Red Line (Lisbon Metro) stations
Green Line (Lisbon Metro) stations
Railway stations opened in 1972
1972 establishments in Portugal